Genesis A (or Elder Genesis) is an Old English poetic adaptation of the first half or so of the biblical book of Genesis. The poem is fused with a passage known today as Genesis B, translated and interpolated from the Old Saxon Genesis.

Genesis A (and B) survive in the Junius Manuscript, which has been held in the Bodleian Library at the University of Oxford since 1677.

Lacunae
The sole manuscript containing Genesis A is incomplete, with a number of leaves missing. This means that, as we have it today, there are gaps (lacunae) in the poem. Paul G. Remley has estimated the number of missing lines thus:

The total length of the combined Genesis A and B poems when the junius Manuscript was complete was therefore around 3339 lines.

Summary 
Genesis A begins before Biblical Genesis—not with the creation of the world but with the creation of Heaven and the angels and with Satan's war on Heaven. Then the poet describes the days of creation, culminating with the creation of Adam and a description of the Garden of Eden. After this, the poem scholars call Genesis B resumes the story of Adam in the Garden, while also going back to the war on Heaven Genesis A already discussed. Following the material from Genesis B, the poem is a fairly close translation of the Biblical book of Genesis up to and including the sacrifice of Isaac (Genesis 22.13).

Textual background 
Scholars consider the poem in the Junius manuscript of separate authorship than Genesis B, though both are presented concurrently in the Junius Manuscript. Charles Leslie Wrenn even considers Genesis A to be a composite work.

Scholars such as Wrenn once considered the work to be partially written by Cædmon, though as far back as Laurence Michel in 1947 there were critics: he calls the attribution based on "circumstantial evidence" and that any connection "may be laid to the prevalence of well-known pious introductory formulas".

Editions and translations
The editions and translations of Genesis A include:
 . https://web.archive.org/web/20181206091232/http://ota.ox.ac.uk/desc/3009
 Doane, A. N. (ed.), Genesis A: A New Edition (Madison, Wisconsin, 1978)
 Aaron K. Hostetter's translation

See also 
 Genesis B
 Old Saxon Genesis

References 

Book of Genesis
Cultural depictions of Adam and Eve
Fiction about the Devil
Apocrypha
Old English poetry